Kiunga Marine National Reserve is situated along the Indian Ocean coast of Lamu District, Coast Province, Kenya.

The park covers an area with approximately 50 islands and coral reefs in the Lamu Archipelago. It borders the Boni and Dodori National Reserves.

The Coast is humid with mean annual temperatures ranging from 22 to 34 °C. Rainfall is about 500 mm/year. It is located at an altitude of 30 meters above MSL. 

The outer islands of the Reserve host many seabirds. Species nesting here include roseate tern, sooty gull, white-cheeked tern, bridled tern and brown node.

References

External links 
 

 

Marine parks of Kenya
National parks of Kenya